Jernej Županič (born 1982) is a Slovenian writer and translator. 

He studied philosophy and comparative literature at university. His debut collection of poems titled Tatar (2016) was widely acclaimed and won multiple literary awards, including the Jenko Award. He has published two novels to date: Mammoths (Mamuti, 2018) and Behemoth (Behemot, 2019). He is also a prize-winning translator of English-language writers such as Jonathan Franzen, David Foster Wallace, Taiye Selasi, Dave Eggers, Lydia Davis, and C.D. Wright. He has won the Radojka Vrančič Award multiple times for his translations.

References

Slovenian writers
1982 births
Living people
Slovenian translators
Translators to Slovene